Harrogate power station supplied electricity to the town of Harrogate and the surrounding area from 1897 to 1960. The power station was built by the Harrogate Corporation which operated it until the nationalisation of the British electricity supply industry in 1948.

History 
The Harrogate Corporation applied for a Provisional Order under the Electric Lighting Acts  to generate and supply electricity to the town of Harrogate. An Order was granted by the Board of Trade and was confirmed by Parliament through the Electric Lighting Orders Confirmation (No. 1) Act 1891 (54 & 55 Vict. c. xlix).

The power station was built north of the town off Ripon Road Harrogate (54°00’03”N 01°33’17”W); it began to supply electricity on 14 April 1897. The site was adjacent to the Oak Beck which provided make-up water to the station's spray cooling pond.

The Central Electricity Board built the first stages of the National Grid between 1927 and 1933. Harrogate power station were connected to the 132 kV electricity grid. In 1935 Ripon ceded its electricity supply rights to the Harrogate electricity undertaking.

The British electricity supply industry was nationalised in 1948 under the provisions of the Electricity Act 1947 (10 & 11 Geo. 6 c. 54). The Harrogate electricity undertaking was abolished, ownership of Harrogate power station was vested in the British Electricity Authority, and subsequently the Central Electricity Authority and the Central Electricity Generating Board (CEGB). At the same time the electricity distribution and sales responsibilities of the Harrogate undertaking were transferred to the North Eastern Electricity Board (NEEB).

Following nationalisation Harrogate power station became part of the Harrogate electricity supply district, covering an area of 192,084 acres (77,734 ha).

Harrogate power station was closed in 1960.

Equipment specification

Plant in 1898 
The plant in 1898 comprised Belliss and McLaren engines coupled directly to Ferranti and Siemens alternators. The capacity of the generating plant was 575 kW and the maximum load was 156 kW.

Plant in 1923 
By 1923 the plant at Harrogate comprised boilers delivering a total of 50,000 lb/h (6.3 kg/s) of steam to:

 1 × 300 kW turbo-alternator generating alternating current (AC)
 1 × 1,000 kW turbo-alternator generating AC
 1 × 1,200 kW turbo-alternator generating AC
 1 × 1,250 kW turbo-alternator generating AC

In addition there was one 400 kW oil-fired engine driven alternator generating AC

The total generating capacity was 4,150 kW.

Plant in 1954 
By 1954 the plant comprised:

 Boilers:
 2 × Holdsworth 12,000 lb/hr (1.51 kg/s), steam conditions were 180 psi at 600 °F (12.4 bar and 316 °C)
 2 × Yarrow 50,000 lb/h (6.3 kg/s), steam conditions were 300 psi and 700 °F (20.7 bar and 371 °C), steam was supplied to:
 Generators (turbo-alternators):
 1 × 1.875 MW Brush
 1 × 4.5 MW F & C, 3.66 kV
 1 × 8.0 MW Parsons, 11 kV
 1 × 1.5 MW F & C, 3.46 kV

The total installed generating capacity was 15.875 MW.

Water cooling was by spray coolers and pond, the circulation capacity was 0.95 million gallons per hour (1.2 m3/s).

Operations

Operating data 1921–23 
The electricity supply data for the period 1921–23 was:

Electricity Loads on the system were:

Revenue from the sale of current (in 1923) was £52,102; the surplus of revenue over expenses was £29,420.

Operating data 1946 
In 1946 Harrogate power station supplied 9,501 MWh of electricity; the maximum output load was 9,076 kW.

Operating data 1954–60 
Operating data for the period 1954–58 was:

Harrogate Electricity District 
Following nationalisation in 1948 Harrogate power station became part of the Harrogate electricity supply district, covering 192,084 acres (77,734 ha). The number of consumers and electricity sold in the Harrogate district was:

In 1958 the number of units sold to categories of consumers was:

See also 

 Timeline of the UK electricity supply industry
 List of power stations in England

References 

Demolished power stations in the United Kingdom
Coal-fired power stations in England
Former power stations in England
Buildings and structures in Harrogate